Terrorism in France refers to the terrorist attacks that have targeted the country and its population during the 20th and 21st centuries. Terrorism, in this case is much related to the country's history, international affairs and political approach. Legislation has been set up by lawmakers to fight terrorism in France.

CBC News reported in December 2018 that the number of people killed in terrorist attacks in France since 2015 was 249, with the number of wounded at 928. Within the European Union, France is the most affected country with recent data showcasing a total of 82 Islamist attacks and 332 deaths from 1979 to 2021.

History

Islamic terrorism

Right-wing terrorism

List of significant terrorist incidents inside France

List of international terrorist incidents with significant French casualties
6 French nationals died as a result of the Kouré shooting in Niger on 9 August 2020.
4 French nationals died as a result of the Étoile du Sud hotel attack in Grand-Bassam in Ivory Coast on 13 March 2016.
3 French nationals died as a result of the Cappuccino restaurant and the Splendid Hotel attack in Ouagadougou, in Burkina Faso on 15 January 2016.
4 French nationals died and seven were injured as a result of the Bardo National Museum attack in Tunisia on 18 March 2015.
2 French nationals died as a result of the assault on the Nairobi Westgate shopping complex in Kenya 21–24 September 2013.
8 French nationals died as a result of the bombing of the Argana Cafe in Jemaa el-Fnaa square of Marrakesh in Morocco on 28 April 2011.
2 French nationals died as a result of attacks on several hotels and other tourist locations in Mumbai in India 26–29 November 2008.
4 French nationals died and one was injured as a result of an armed attack on a group of tourists on holiday near Aleg in Mauritania on 24 December 2007.
4 French nationals died as a result of the bombing of several Balinese tourist clubs in Indonesia on 12 October 2002.
4 French nationals died as a result of the September 11 attacks.

Foiled attacks

In 2015, a 26-year-old Moroccan man known as a member of the radical Islamist movement attempted to open fire with an AK47 assault rifle while on a high speed train one hour from Paris. He was quickly subdued by three United States servicemen who were on holiday. See: 2015 Thalys train attack

Towards the end of March 2016, police arrested a Paris citizen named Reda Kriket, and upon searching his apartment, they discovered five assault rifles, a number of handguns, and an amount of chemical substances that could be used to make explosives.

Kriket was convicted in absentia by a Belgian court in a 2015 case involving Abdelhamid Abaaoud.

Murder of Sarah Halimi
Under French law, any grave act of violence committed with intent "to seriously disturb public order through intimidation or terror", is an act of terrorism; the public prosecutor decides which cases will be investigated as acts of terrorism. Writing in Le Figaro attorney Gilles-William Goldnadel characterized the public prosecutor's decision not to investigate a crime, Murder of Sarah Halimi as terrorism, as "purely and simply ideological", asserting that the killer, who recited verses form the Quran before breaking into an apartment and murdering a Jewish woman, "had the profile of a radical Islamist, and yet somehow there is a resistance to call a spade a spade". Sarah Halimi's murder was heard by neighbors in her building and in neighboring building over an extended period of time. Neighbors also saw the killer throw his victim from the balcony of her home, and heard the killer praying aloud after the murder. In September, 2017, the prosecutor officially characterized the murder as an "antisemitic" hate crime.

According to Jean-Charles Brisard, director of the French think tank Center for the Analysis of Terrorism, "It needs to have a certain degree of willingness to disrupt the French public order."

See also
Law on the fight against terrorism, 2006 French legislation
Terrorism in the European Union
List of Islamist terrorist attacks
ISIL-related terror attacks in France
 2014 Dijon attack
 Murder of Sarah Halimi
 List of massacres in France
Jean-François Ricard (born 1956), prosecutor of the National Terrorism Prosecution Office for the prosecution of terrorism in France

References

 
France
Human rights abuses in France